5-Ethynyl-2′-deoxyuridine (EdU) is a thymidine analogue which is incorporated into the DNA of dividing cells.  EdU is used to assay DNA synthesis in cell culture and detect cells in embryonic, neonatal and adult animals which have undergone DNA synthesis. Whilst at high doses it can be cytotoxic, this molecule is now widely used to track proliferating cells in multiple biological systems.

EdU-labelling allows cells to be isolated without denaturing DNA, allowing researchers to determine the transcriptional profile of cells. This approach has been used to assess transcription in neuronal cells and tissues that have recently divided either in vitro or in vivo.

Detection
EdU is detected with a fluorescent azide which forms a covalent bond using click chemistry.  Unlike the commonly used bromodeoxyuridine (BrdU), EdU detection requires no heat or acid treatment. EdU incorporated into DNA may induce DNA damage, primarily during DNA replication, which is reflected by phosphorylation of histone H2AX, arrest in the cell cycle progression and apoptosis.

References

External links

Nucleosides
Staining dyes
Pyrimidinediones
Ethynyl compounds